Luke Saville and John-Patrick Smith were the defending champions but chose not to defend their title.

JC Aragone and Adrián Menéndez Maceiras won the title after defeating Nicolás Mejía and Roberto Quiroz 7–6(7–4), 6–2 in the final.

Seeds

Draw

References

External links
 Main draw

Morelos Open - Doubles
2022 Doubles